Zhongchuan (Chinese: 中川; pinyin: Zhōngchuān; lit. 'middle of the plain') may refer to the following locations in China:

 Lanzhou Zhongchuan International Airport, Lanzhou, Gansu Province
 Zhongchuan, Lanzhou, a town of Lanzhou New Area, Gansu
 Zhongchuan, Huining, a town of Huining County, Gansu
 , a township of Minhe Hui and Tu Autonomous County
 Zhongchuan village in Wushan County, Gansu
 Zhongchuan village in Hui County, Gansu
 Zhongchuan village in Li County, Gansu
 Zhongchuan village in Yongding District, Longyan